Lynn Basa (born 1954) is an American painter, sculpturer public artist, and author living in Chicago Illinois. Basa attended Indiana University for her under graduate degree and University of Washington for her master's degree. She is best known as the author of the book The Artist's Guide to Public Art: How to Find and Win Commissions. Some of her permanent public art commissions include a mosaic for the CTA Argyle Station, a mosaic for the University of Wisconsin-Madison, and a mosaic for a new building for Salt Lake City's Ballet West. Basa taught sculpture at the School of the Art Institute of Chicago from 2006 to 2012.

References

External links 
 artist website
 Artists studio

1954 births
Living people
American women painters
American women writers
School of the Art Institute of Chicago faculty
21st-century American women artists
American women academics